The Chengdu University of Science and Technology was a public university in Chengdu, Sichuan, China.

Founded in 1952 by a central government-ordered separation from National Sichuan University, the institution was named the Chengdu Engineering College and affiliated with the Chinese Academy of Sciences. In 1978, this institution attained university status and changed its name to the Chengdu University of Science and Technology. In 1993, the university was merged back into Sichuan University.

References 

Educational institutions established in 1952
Universities and colleges in Chengdu
Sichuan University
1952 establishments in China